Kakahi may refer to:
Kākahi, the Māori name for the New Zealand freshwater mussel
Kakahi, New Zealand, a King Country locality on the Whanganui River named for the freshwater mussel
Tohu Kākahi (1828–1907), Māori leader